Langwell may refer to:

East Langwell, settlement in the Scottish Highlands
West Langwell, settlement in the Scottish Highlands
The fictional Langwell river in The Lord of the Rings.
 An Intel codename for a particular Platform Controller Hub.